Transmembrane protein 254 is a transmembrane protein that is encoded by the TMEM254 gene, it is predicted to have many orthologs across eukaryotes.

Gene 

TMEM254 is located on the long arm of chromosome 10, open reading frame 57 on the positive strand. It is found at position 10q22.3. It has seven known transcript variants.

This image shows the cytogenetic band of human chromosome 10 and the various gene locations on it. TMEM254 can be seen at the thin red band with the box around, placed at q22.3.

mRNA 

TMEM254 consists of ten total exons and is 13,911 bp in length.

Isoforms
TMEM254 has 3 isoforms produced by alternative splicing.

Protein 

TMEM254 contains:
147 amino acids.
Five transmembrane domains
Molecular weight 16.4 kilodaltons
Isoelectric point 9.39
domain of unknown function 4499 (DUF4499) region
The secondary structure of TMEM254 is predicted to consist of alternating pairs of alpha helices and beta sheets.

Expression

According to a human GEO profile and human and mouse EST profiles, TMEM254 appears to be expressed at a relatively high level in most tissues.

TMEM254 is highly expressed in reproductive structures, and a wide range of cells. These include, but are not limited to, thyroid gland, pancreas, kidney, skin, breasts, and testes.

Homology
There are no known paralogs for transmembrane protein 254, however it does have various orthologs within orthologs within eukaryotes. The following table presents some of the orthologs found using searches in BLAST. A comparison of a wide variety of known TMEM254 orthologs meant to display the diversity of species for which orthologs are found is listed in the table below:

Predicted Post-Translational Modification

Using various tools at ExPASy the following are possible post-translational modifications for TMEM254.
4 possible PKC phosphorylation sites 
3 possible PKA phosphorylation sites

References